Walter Storrie (2 January 1875 — 3 December 1945) was a Scottish first-class cricketer.

Storrie was born at Hawick in February 1885. A club cricketer for Hawick and Wilton, Storrie was selected to represent Scotland in a single first-class match against Ireland at Glasgow in 1911; also making his first-class debut in this match was his younger brother, James. Batting twice in the match, he was dismissed in the Scottish first innings without scoring by Gus Kelly, while in their second innings he was promoted to open the batting and was dismissed for 8 runs by Bob Lambert. Outside of cricket, he was a cashier for Messrs Peter Scott & Co., hosiery manufacturers. Storrie died at Hawick in December 1945.

References

External links
 

1875 births
1945 deaths
Sportspeople from Hawick
Scottish cricketers